The Tragedy of Nero, Emperour of Rome is a 1674 tragedy by the English writer Nathaniel Lee. It was originally performed at the Theatre Royal, Drury Lane by the King's Company.

The first Drury Lane cast included Charles Hart as Nero, Michael Mohun as Britannicus, Nicholas Burt as Petronius, William Wintershall as Otho, Edward Lydall as Piso, William Cartwright as Seneca, Thomas Clark as Drusillus, John Coysh as  Plautus, Marmaduke Watson as  Silvius, Martin Powell as Mirmilon, Philip Griffin as Caligula's Ghost, Rebecca Marshall as Poppea, Katherine Corey as Agrippina, Elizabeth Cox as Octavia and Elizabeth Boutell as Cyara.

References

Bibliography
 Van Lennep, W. The London Stage, 1660-1800: Volume One, 1660-1700. Southern Illinois University Press, 1960.

1674 plays
West End plays
Tragedy plays
Plays by Nathaniel Lee
Plays set in ancient Rome
Plays set in the 1st century
Cultural depictions of Otho
Cultural depictions of Nero
Cultural depictions of Claudia Octavia